Tabriz earthquake may refer to:

1641 Tabriz earthquake, an earthquake near Tabriz, Iran on February 5, 1641
1721 Tabriz earthquake, an earthquake near Tabriz, Iran on April 26, 1721
1727 Tabriz earthquake, earthquake near Tabriz, Iran on 18 November 1727
1780 Tabriz earthquake, earthquake near Tabriz, Iran on 8 January 1780
2012 Tabriz earthquakes, a pair of earthquakes near Tabriz, Iran on August 11, 2012

See also
List of earthquakes in Iran